Pristorhynchini is a weevil tribe in the subfamily Entiminae.

References 

 Heer, O. 1847: Die Insektenfauna der Tertiärgebilde von Oeningen und von Radoboj in Croatien. Erste Abtheilung: Käfer. Neue Denkschriften der Allgemeinen schweizerischen Gesellschaft für die gesammten Naturwissenschaften, 8: 1-229 + index + 8 pl. [separately paginated].
 Alonso-Zarazaga, M.A.; Lyal, C.H.C. 1999: A world catalogue of families and genera of Curculionoidea (Insecta: Coleoptera) (excepting Scolytidae and Platypodidae). Entomopraxis, Barcelona.

External links 

Entiminae
Polyphaga tribes